Edward Payson Allen (October 28, 1839 – November 25, 1909) was a politician from the U.S. state of Michigan. He served two terms in the United States House of Representatives from 1887 to 1891.

Early years
Allen was born in Sharon Township, Michigan, on October 28, 1839, and attended the district and select schools. Until his twentieth year his time was divided between farm labor in summer and attending and teaching school in winter. He graduated from the State normal school (now Eastern Michigan University) in 1864, going thence to Vassar, Michigan, where for three months he taught the Union School. In June, 1864, near the end of the American Civil War, Allen enlisted and helped to raise a company for the Twenty-ninth Regiment, Michigan Volunteer Infantry, he was commissioned first lieutenant in September 1864 and before the close of the war, he was promoted to a captaincy. He mustered out with his regiment in September 1865.

Career
Allen graduated from the law school of University of Michigan at Ann Arbor in March 1867 and was admitted to the bar, commenced practice in co-partnership with the Hon. B. M. Cutcheon in Ypsilanti. He became assistant assessor of internal revenue in 1869 and prosecuting attorney of Washtenaw County in 1872. He was  alderman of Ypsilanti 1872-1874 and was elected to the Michigan State House of Representatives in 1876 and again in 1878, at which time he was elected speaker pro tempore. He was mayor of Ypsilanti in 1880 and was appointed United States Indian agent for Michigan in August 1882, serving until December 1885.

Allen lost his first election for the United States House of Representatives in 1884. In 1886, Allen was elected as a Republican from Michigan's 2nd congressional district for the Fiftieth and Fifty-first Congresses, serving from March 4, 1887 to March 3, 1891. He was an unsuccessful candidate for reelection in 1890 to the Fifty-second Congress.

Last years
After leaving Congress, Allen resumed the practice of law and was a member of the State board of agriculture 1897-1903 and was again mayor of Ypsilanti in 1899 and 1900. He was a member of the State soldiers’ home board 1903-1909. Allen died from a stroke in Ypsilanti and is interred in Highland Cemetery there.

References

Citations

Sources
 
 Retrieved on 2009-04-11
The Political Graveyard

1839 births
1909 deaths
Burials at Highland Cemetery
Michigan lawyers
Republican Party members of the Michigan House of Representatives
People of Michigan in the American Civil War
Politicians from Ypsilanti, Michigan
Republican Party members of the United States House of Representatives from Michigan
Eastern Michigan University alumni
University of Michigan Law School alumni
19th-century American politicians
Mayors of Ypsilanti, Michigan